Fadhil al-Manasif is a photographer and member of the Saudi human rights organization Adala Center for Human Rights. Authorities arrested him in April 2009 along with 20 others for participating in protests and again in May 2011 for disseminating information to human rights groups and international media outlets covering street protests in the Eastern Province. In April 2014 the Specialized Criminal Court sentenced al-Manasif to 15 years in prison, imposed a 15-year ban on foreign travel, and fined him 100,000 Riyals (around $US 26,660), on charges including “breaking allegiance with the ruler,” “being in contact with foreign news agencies to exaggerate news and harm the reputation of Saudi Arabia and its people,” and communicating with international human rights organizations. The punishment was later reduced to 14 years on appeal.

References

Living people
Year of birth missing (living people)